The Diamond Shamrock and Kwik Stop Boycott was a protest organized by the Nation of Islam against the Diamond Shamrock gas station in Dallas, Texas. Using the slogan Don't Stop, Don't Shop, the organization picketed the Kwik Stop convenience store located at 1909 Martin Luther King, Jr. Blvd. in the first half of 2012.

The protest was organized after an incident in which the Korean owner of the convenience store refused to waive a $5 minimum charge for debit card transactions for the African-American leader of the local Nation of Islam chapter, Jeffrey Muhammad, which was allegedly followed by an exchange of racial epithets between the two men. The South Korean consul general from Houston was dispatched in an attempt to resolve the issue. In 2010, a Korean employee of the store shot and killed Marcus Phillips, a 26-year-old African-American who appeared to be attempting to steal the cash register.

The protest has been supported by the Dallas chapter of the NAACP. Anthony Bond, the founder of the Irving chapter of the NAACP, has called for the protest to end and has contacted the United States Department of Justice to request assistance from a Community Relations Service representative. Meanwhile, the president of the Dallas NAACP chapter and Nation of Islam activists vowed to continue protesting, although they came to an end in the middle of 2012.

The Diamond Shamrock petrol station and Kwik Stop convenience store was demolished in autumn 2018 and it is currently an empty lot.

References

External links
video of the protest

Nation of Islam
2010s in Dallas
2011 in Texas
2012 in Texas
Civil rights protests in the United States
History of African-American civil rights
Korean-American history
African Americans in Texas
African-American–Asian-American relations